Mahmud Salem Horan Mohammed Mutlak Al Ali is a citizen of Syria, best known for the more than eight years he spent in the Guantanamo Bay detention camps in Cuba after being classified as an enemy combatant by the United States.
His Guantanamo Internment Serial Number was 537.
Joint Task Force Guantanamo counter-terrorism analysts report that Mahmud Salem Horan Mohammed Mutlak Al Ali was born on May 5, 1974, in Doha, Kuwait.

Al Ali and Palestinian Ohmed Ahmed Mahamoud Al Shurfa were released to Germany on September 16, 2010.

Combatant Status Review

A Summary of Evidence memo was prepared for the tribunal. His memo accused him of the following:

The memo was published three times.  The first two instances contained redactions.

Mahmud Salem Horan Mohammed Mutlak Al Ali v. George Walker Bush
A writ of habeas corpus, Mahmud Salem Horan Mohammed Mutlak Al Ali v. George Walker Bush, was submitted on
Mahmud Salem Horan Mohammed Mutlak Al Ali's behalf.
In response, on May 6, 2005,
the Department of Defense released 15
pages of unclassified documents related to his Combatant Status Review Tribunal.

Detainee election form
On October 21, 2004, his Personal Representative met with him,
from 8:12 am to 8:32 am.
His Person Representative recorded on his Detainee election form:

{| class="wikitable"
|
Detainee does not desire to participate in the Tribunal.  Tribunal will be In Absentia. Detainee was unresponsive and did  not say a word during the entire interview.  However, I was able to present the unclassified evidence to him, which he read over two times.  I have completed the initial interview silent detainee worksheet.  Please cancel the 22 Oct, 0800 followup and 26 Oct 730 Final.  The IA Tribunal is currently scheduled for 27 Oct, 1300.
|}

Decision memo
His "enemy combatant" status was confirmed by
Tribunal panel 15, which convened October 23, 2004.
The decision memo recorded that the captive did not participate in his Tribunal.  It recorded that the Tribunal relied entirely on classified evidence.

{| class="wikitable"
|
The Personal Representative advised the detainee of his rights and gave the detainee a translated copy of the unclassified summary of the evidence.  The PR said the detainee read the unclassified summary twice then handed it back to the PR.  The detainee made a sarcastic expression indicating to the PR that the detainee understood the unclassified summary. The detainee was unresponsive to PR and that is how the PR determined that the detainee did  want to participate in the Tribunal proceedings as outlined in exhibit D-a.  The detainee did not participate in the hearing.
|}

Boumediene v. Bush
On June 12, 2008, the United States Supreme Court ruled, in Boumediene v. Bush, that the Military Commissions Act could not remove the right for Guantanamo captives to access the US Federal Court system.  All previous Guantanamo captives' habeas petitions were re-instated.
On July 18, 2008, Samuel C. Kauffman renewed his habeas petition.

Administrative Review Board 

Detainees whose Combatant Status Review Tribunal labeled them "enemy combatants" were scheduled for annual Administrative Review Board hearings.  These hearings were designed to assess the threat a detainee might pose if released or transferred, and whether there were other factors that warranted his continued detention.

First annual Administrative Review Board
A Summary of Evidence memo was prepared for
Mahmud Salem Horan Mohammed Mutlak Al Ali's
first annual
Administrative Review Board,
on October 6, 2005.
The memo listed twenty-two "primary factors favor[ing] continued detention" and nine "primary factors favor[ing] release or transfer".

Second annual Administrative Review Board
A Summary of Evidence memo was prepared for
Mahmud Salem Horan Mohammed Mutlak Al Ali's
second annual
Administrative Review Board,
on
June 19, 2006.
The memo listed six "primary factors favor[ing] continued detention" and six "primary factors favor[ing] release or transfer".

Transfer to Germany

Al-Ali and
Saudi captive Ohmed Ahmed Mahamoud Al Shurfa
another man were transferred to Germany on September 16, 2010.
Al-Ali was transferred to the Rhineland-Palatinate.

According to Der Spiegel Germany's Federal Government had sought the agreement of local authorities prior to completing the transfer.
According to Der Spiegel, German officials asserted that American officials had cleared the two men of suspicion of involvement with terrorism.
Der Spiegel reported a German official asserted: "According to our knowledge, he does not pose any threat ... We haven't brought a sleeper into our country,"
German officials conducted interviews with the two men, in Guantanamo, in March, to confirm their suitability for transfer to Germany.
German officials contacted security officials in other European countries, to confirm they had no reason to suspect the men had ties to terrorism.

References

External links
 Who Are the Two Guantánamo Prisoners Freed in Germany? Andy Worthington, September 21, 2010

Living people
Syrian extrajudicial prisoners of the United States
1974 births
Guantanamo detainees known to have been released